Brothers of (Our Lady of) Mercy may refer to:

 Brothers Hospitallers of Saint John of God, a Catholic hospitaller order
 Brothers of Mercy of Our Lady of Perpetual Help, a Catholic religious institute
 Brothers of Our Lady, Mother of Mercy of Tilburg, a Dutch Catholic lay religious congregation